Wartislaw (Polish Warcisław) is a Polish name. It may refer to:

Wartislaw I, Duke of Pomerania (c. 1091-1135)
Wartislaw II, Duke of Pomerania (1160-1184)
Wartislaw III, Duke of Pomerania (1210-1264)
Wartislaw IV, Duke of Pomerania (before 1290–1326)
Wartislaw V, Duke of Pomerania (1326-1390)
Wartislaw VI, Duke of Pomerania (1345-1394)
Wartislaw VII, Duke of Pomerania (1363/1365–1394/1395)
Wartislaw VIII, Duke of Pomerania (1373-1415)
Wartislaw IX, Duke of Pomerania (c. 1400-1457)
Wartislaw X, Duke of Pomerania (1435-1478)